The 1992 MTV Movie Awards was hosted by Dennis Miller.

Performers
En Vogue — "My Lovin' (You're Never Gonna Get It)"
Ugly Kid Joe — "Everything About You"
Arrested Development — "Tennessee"
Vince Neil — "You're Invited (But Your Friend Can't Come)"

Awards

Best Movie
Terminator 2: Judgment Day
Backdraft
Boyz n the Hood
JFK
Robin Hood: Prince of Thieves

Best Male Performance
Arnold Schwarzenegger – Terminator 2: Judgment Day
Kevin Costner – Robin Hood: Prince of Thieves
Robert De Niro – Cape Fear
Val Kilmer – The Doors
Robin Williams - The Fisher King

Best Female Performance
Linda Hamilton – Terminator 2: Judgment Day
Geena Davis – Thelma and Louise
Rebecca De Mornay – The Hand That Rocks the Cradle
Mary Elizabeth Mastrantonio – Robin Hood: Prince of Thieves
Julia Roberts – Dying Young

Most Desirable Male
Keanu Reeves – Point Break
Kevin Costner – Robin Hood: Prince of Thieves
Christian Slater – Kuffs
Patrick Swayze – Point Break
Jean-Claude Van Damme – Double Impact

Most Desirable Female
Linda Hamilton – Terminator 2: Judgment Day
Christina Applegate – Don't Tell Mom the Babysitter's Dead
Kim Basinger – Final Analysis
Tia Carrere – Wayne's World
Julia Roberts – Dying Young

Breakthrough Performance
Edward Furlong – Terminator 2: Judgment Day
Anna Chlumsky – My Girl
Campbell Scott – Dying Young
Ice-T – New Jack City
Kimberly Williams – Father of the Bride

Best On-Screen Duo
Dana Carvey and Mike Myers – Wayne's World
Damon Wayans and Bruce Willis – The Last Boy Scout
Anna Chlumsky and Macaulay Culkin – My Girl
Kevin Costner and Morgan Freeman – Robin Hood: Prince of Thieves
Geena Davis and Susan Sarandon – Thelma and Louise

Best Villain
Rebecca De Mornay – The Hand That Rocks the Cradle
Robert De Niro – Cape Fear
Robert Patrick – Terminator 2: Judgment Day
Alan Rickman – Robin Hood: Prince of Thieves
Wesley Snipes – New Jack City

Best Comedic Performance
Billy Crystal – City Slickers
Dana Carvey – Wayne's World
Steve Martin – Father of the Bride
Bill Murray – What About Bob?
Mike Myers – Wayne's World

Best Song from a Movie
Bryan Adams — "(Everything I Do) I Do It for You" (from Robin Hood: Prince of Thieves)
MC Hammer — "Addams Groove" (from The Addams Family)
Color Me Badd — "I Wanna Sex You Up" (from New Jack City)
Eric Clapton — "Tears in Heaven" (from Rush)
Guns N' Roses — "You Could Be Mine" (from Terminator 2: Judgment Day)

Best Kiss
Anna Chlumsky and Macaulay Culkin – My Girl
Anjelica Huston and Raúl Juliá – The Addams Family
Annette Bening and Warren Beatty – Bugsy
Juliette Lewis and Robert De Niro – Cape Fear
Priscilla Presley and Leslie Nielsen – The Naked Gun 2½: The Smell of Fear

Best Action Sequence
L.A. Freeway Scene – Terminator 2: Judgment Day
Burning Building/Escape Through Old Tunnel – Backdraft
Roof Scene – The Hard Way
Helicopter Blades Sequence – The Last Boy Scout
Second Jump from the Plane – Point Break

Best New Filmmaker Award
John Singleton – Boyz n the Hood

Lifetime Achievement Award
Jason Voorhees – Friday the 13th series

External links
  MTV Movie Awards official site 
MTV Movie Awards: 1992 at the Internet Movie Database

MTV Movie & TV Awards
Mtv Movie Awards